Chain Lightning is a 1950 American aviation film based on the story "These Many Years" by blacklisted writer Lester Cole (under the pseudonym "J. Redmond Prior"); the screenplay was written by Liam O'Brien and Vincent B. Evans. During World War II, Evans had been the bombardier on the Boeing B-17 Flying Fortress Memphis Belle.

The film stars Humphrey Bogart as a test pilot along with Eleanor Parker and Raymond Massey. Cole's credit on the film was officially restored by the Writers Guild of America in 1997.

Created in the postwar era to reflect progress in aviation and aeronautics, the film is a fictional account of an American company that builds high-speed jet aircraft. Chain Lightning was one of Bogart's final Warner Bros. films, ending a 20-year association.

The film was released in multiple versions for 11 different countries; in Germany, it was known as Des Teufels Pilot.

Plot
Lt. Colonel Matt Brennan, a B-17 bomber pilot in World War II, runs a civilian flying school in peacetime. He is reunited with an old US Army Air Force buddy, Major Hinkle.

Brennan is offered a job at the Willis Aircraft Company as chief test pilot for an experimental high-speed jet fighter known as the JA-3, designed by Carl Troxell, who knows Brennan from the war (having accompanied him on a bombing mission over Germany to evaluate the B-17's real-life performance).

At the same time, Troxell tries to finish developing a safer version of the revolutionary aircraft, the JA-4. He is killed during a high altitude test flight while testing a pilot escape pod.

The record-breaking flight is a big success. Brennan earns $30,000, enough to propose marriage to Jo Holloway, his former wartime flame who is now Willis's secretary. Despite his earlier reservations about the need for safety systems and with Troxell's death in mind, Brennan secretly flies the second JA-4 for the government demonstration. He ejects in the escape pod, proving that Troxell's design is safe for pilots. On safely landing, he falls into Jo's arms.

Cast

Production

Principal filming took place from April 16, 1949 to July 1949, but final production was held back from release until 1950. In order to realistically depict the flight testing, permission was obtained to film at various Air Force bases, including Muroc Army Air Field (now Edwards Air Force Base). Location shooting also occurred at the San Fernando Valley Airport (now Van Nuys Airport). A realistic full-scale JA-3/JA-4 model created by Paul Mantz, the aerial sequence director, was built for $15,000. The origins of the film model stemmed from a derelict Bell P-39 Airacobra fuselage that had been reworked by Vince Johnson, an expert "lofter". The Warner Bros. contract called for completion of a realistic (if futuristic) fighter able to taxi and deploy parachutes. Besides the full-scale model used for most of the ground sequences, a number of scale models were built. A Willis JA-3 fibreglass miniature used in the production, measuring 80 in. long and a wingspan of 59 in., was auctioned in 2009 for $1,300.

Revisiting his use of the wartime fleet of aircraft that he had obtained for films such as Twelve O'Clock High (1949), Mantz's B-17F, 42–3369, appearing as “Naughty Nellie,” recreated the wartime missions that the central character recalls in a flashback sequence. Stock footage of bomber missions over Germany includes a brief view of the Messerschmitt Me 163 rocket fighter that is the inspiration for the later postwar supersonic fighter that one of the central characters envisions.

Reception
The film fared well with the public, as record-breaking aircraft were often in the news. When Chain Lightning premiered at the recently renamed Edwards Air Force Base, where location shooting had taken place, veteran pilots such as Chuck Yeager were able to easily spot the film's artifice, especially in a scene in which the Willis JA-3 is towed down the runway with the tow cable clearly evident.

Box Office
According to Warner Bros. accounts, the film earned $1,665,000 domestically and $890,000 foreign.

Critical
Chain Lightning is considered by some as among Bogart's lesser features, and some have argued that it has the look of a B film. The main criticism stems from a limited plotline that does not fully allow for the characters' development. A contemporary review in The New York Times stated that the true star of the film was the technology on display: "Like its title, this vehicle moves with exciting speed when it is airborne, but it slows down to a plodding walk... when it hits the ground."

With the incorporation of highly advanced aviation technology and equipment, including escape pods, braking parachutes, G-suits and mixed jet/rocket power plants, some reviewers considered the film to be in the science fiction genre, given its setting in the year 1949. The film's aviation advisor Paul Mantz envisioned an "aircraft of tomorrow" when designing the centerpiece aircraft and models, accurately predicting much of today's modern jet-aircraft technology.

Home media
Chain Lightning was released in VHS format in 1992 by MGM/UA Home Entertainment, though without the corrected writing credit for Lester Cole. Warner Archives released an official DVD on January 24, 2012 and Later In Blu-ray on June 22, 2021.

References

Notes

Bibliography

 Dwiggins, Don. Hollywood Pilot: The Biography of Paul Mantz. Garden City, New York: Doubleday & Company, Inc., 1967. 
 Hardwick, Jack and Ed Schnepf. "A Buff's Guide to Aviation Movies". Air Progress Aviation Vol. 7, No. 1, Spring 1983.
 Michael, Paul. Humphrey Bogart: The Man and his Films. New York: Bonanza Books, 1965.

External links
 
 
 
 

1950 films
1950 drama films
American drama films
American aviation films
American black-and-white films
Films about test pilots
Films directed by Stuart Heisler
Films scored by David Buttolph
Films about the United States Air Force
Warner Bros. films
1950s English-language films
1950s American films